Michael Patrick Marchesano (born 23 September 1975) is an Italian baseball player who competed in the 2004 Summer Olympics.

References

1975 births
Living people
Olympic baseball players of Italy
Baseball players at the 2004 Summer Olympics
Brockton Rox players
Canton Crocodiles players
Duluth-Superior Dukes players
Long Beach Armada players
Macoto Gida players
Nashua Pride players
Rimini Baseball Club players
Sioux City Explorers players
Will County Cheetahs players
American expatriate baseball players in Taiwan
Italian expatriate baseball players in Taiwan
Baseball players from Fort Wayne, Indiana